An aquatic ecosystem is an ecosystem formed by  surrounding a body of water, in contrast to land-based terrestrial ecosystems. Aquatic ecosystems contain communities of organisms—aquatic life—that are dependent on each other and on their environment. The two main types of aquatic ecosystems are marine ecosystems and freshwater ecosystems. Freshwater ecosystems may be lentic (slow moving water, including pools, ponds, and lakes); lotic (faster moving water, for example streams and rivers); and wetlands (areas where the soil is saturated or inundated for at least part of the time).

Types

Marine ecosystems

Marine coastal ecosystem

Marine surface ecosystem

Freshwater ecosystems

Lentic ecosystem (lakes)

Lotic ecosystem (rivers)

Wetlands

Functions

Aquatic ecosystems perform many important environmental functions. For example, they recycle nutrients, purify water, attenuate floods, recharge ground water and provide habitats for wildlife. Aquatic ecosystems are also used for human recreation, and are very important to the tourism industry, especially in coastal regions. They are also used for religious purposes, such as the worshipping of the Jordan River by Christians, and educational purposes, such as the usage of lakes for ecological study.

Biotic characteristics (living components)
The biotic characteristics are mainly determined by the organisms that occur.  For example, wetland plants may produce dense canopies that cover large areas of sediment—or snails or geese may graze the vegetation leaving large mud flats. Aquatic environments have relatively low oxygen levels, forcing adaptation by the organisms found there.  For example, many wetland plants must produce aerenchyma to carry oxygen to roots. Other biotic characteristics are more subtle and difficult to measure, such as the relative importance of competition, mutualism or predation. There are a growing number of cases where predation by coastal herbivores including snails, geese and mammals appears to be a dominant biotic factor.

Autotrophic organisms
Autotrophic organisms are producers that generate organic compounds from inorganic material. Algae use solar energy to generate biomass from carbon dioxide and are possibly the most important autotrophic organisms in aquatic environments. The more shallow the water, the greater the biomass contribution from rooted and floating vascular plants. These two sources combine to produce the extraordinary production of estuaries and wetlands, as this autotrophic biomass is converted into fish, birds, amphibians and other aquatic species.

Chemosynthetic bacteria are found in benthic marine ecosystems. These organisms are able to feed on hydrogen sulfide in water that comes from volcanic vents. Great concentrations of animals that feed on these bacteria are found around volcanic vents. For example, there are giant tube worms (Riftia pachyptila) 1.5 m in length and clams (Calyptogena magnifica) 30 cm long.

Heterotrophic organisms
Heterotrophic organisms consume autotrophic organisms and use the organic compounds in their bodies as energy sources and as raw materials to create their own biomass. 

Euryhaline organisms are salt tolerant and can survive in marine ecosystems, while stenohaline or salt intolerant species can only live in freshwater environments.

Abiotic characteristics (non-living components) 
An ecosystem is composed of biotic communities that are structured by biological interactions and abiotic environmental factors. Some of the important abiotic environmental factors of aquatic ecosystems include substrate type, water depth, nutrient levels, temperature, salinity, and flow. It is often difficult to determine the relative importance of these factors without rather large experiments.  There may be complicated feedback loops.  For example, sediment may determine the presence of aquatic plants, but aquatic plants may also trap sediment, and add to the sediment through peat.

The amount of dissolved oxygen in a water body is frequently the key substance in determining the extent and kinds of organic life in the water body. Fish need dissolved oxygen to survive, although their tolerance to low oxygen varies among species; in extreme cases of low oxygen, some fish even resort to air gulping. Plants often have to produce aerenchyma, while the shape and size of leaves may also be altered. Conversely, oxygen is fatal to many kinds of anaerobic bacteria.

Nutrient levels are important in controlling the abundance of many species of algae. The relative abundance of nitrogen and phosphorus can in effect determine which species of algae come to dominate. Algae are a very important source of food for aquatic life, but at the same time, if they become over-abundant, they can cause declines in fish when they decay. Similar over-abundance of algae in coastal environments such as the Gulf of Mexico produces, upon decay, a hypoxic region of water known as a dead zone.

The salinity of the water body is also a determining factor in the kinds of species found in the water body. Organisms in marine ecosystems tolerate salinity, while many freshwater organisms are intolerant of salt. The degree of salinity in an estuary or delta is an important control upon the type of wetland (fresh, intermediate, or brackish), and the associated animal species.  Dams built upstream may reduce spring flooding, and reduce sediment accretion, and may therefore lead to saltwater intrusion in coastal wetlands.

Freshwater used for irrigation purposes often absorbs levels of salt that are harmful to freshwater organisms.

Threats 

The health of an aquatic ecosystem is degraded when the ecosystem's ability to absorb a stress has been exceeded. A stress on an aquatic ecosystem can be a result of physical, chemical or biological alterations to the environment. Physical alterations include changes in water temperature, water flow and light availability. Chemical alterations include changes in the loading rates of biostimulatory nutrients, oxygen-consuming materials, and toxins. Biological alterations include over-harvesting of commercial species and the introduction of exotic species. Human populations can impose excessive stresses on aquatic ecosystems. 

There are many examples of excessive stresses with negative consequences. The environmental history of the Great Lakes of North America illustrates this problem, particularly how multiple stresses, such as water pollution, over-harvesting and invasive species can combine. The Norfolk Broadlands in England illustrate similar decline with pollution and invasive species. Lake Pontchartrain along the Gulf of Mexico illustrates the negative effects of different stresses including levee construction, logging of swamps, invasive species and salt water intrusion.

See also 
 
 
 
 
Ocean
  - one of the founders of aquatic ecosystem science

References

Aquatic ecology
Ecosystems
Aquatic plants
Fisheries science
Systems ecology
Water